Chicago, Milwaukee, St. Paul and Pacific Railroad Depot may refer to:

Chicago, Milwaukee, St. Paul and Pacific Railroad Depot (Albert Lea, Minnesota), listed on the National Register of Historic Places in Freeborn County, Minnesota
Chicago, Milwaukee, St. Paul and Pacific Railroad Depot (Farmington, Minnesota), listed on the National Register of Historic Places in Dakota County, Minnesota
 Chicago, Milwaukee, St. Paul and Pacific Railroad Depot (Aberdeen, South Dakota), listed on the NRHP in Brown County, South Dakota

See also
Chicago, St. Paul, Minneapolis, and Omaha Depot (disambiguation)